Medal of Honor: Frontline is a first-person shooter video game, in the Medal of Honor series, and was published by Electronic Arts. The player character is Lt. Jimmy Patterson, from the American Office of Strategic Services. Frontline takes place during the events of the first game and chronicles Patterson's journey as he fights his way across Europe into Nazi Germany during World War II. Frontline was released in North America for the PlayStation 2 on May 29, 2002 and for the GameCube and Xbox consoles on November 7, 2002.

Developed by EA Los Angeles, the game was the first Medal of Honor by the studio after being purchased by Electronic Arts from DreamWorks SKG and Microsoft in February 2000. It is also the first game in the series without the involvement of Steven Spielberg, creator of the series. In 2010, an HD port of the game was included in the "Limited Edition" PlayStation 3 version of Medal of Honor.

Gameplay

Frontline is a first-person shooter where players take control of the protagonist player character in a first-person perspective where they fight through levels set during the Second World War against the Wehrmacht using historical weaponry of the era, performing a series of military operations. Briefings take place at the start of each mission, which advance the plot and introduce new characters. Each mission is structured through a number of linear levels, each with differing locations, levels of action and styles of gameplay. Initially the player character begins on the frontlines during D-Day backed up by other computer AI-controlled soldiers with an emphasis on fast action-orientated gun-based gameplay. As the story progress however, the player character is sent on a variety of other missions including a number of covert and undercover operations in locations such as military bases, German-occupied towns and manors, submarines and countryside settings. The player character is tasked with objectives during levels that range from infiltration, espionage, rescue and recon. Because of the variety between missions and locations, gameplay changes pace. While many missions involve Allied assaults on German targets others include elements of stealth and exploration. For example, one selections of missions has the player detach from an allied raid to infiltrate a German U-boat in order to get to a secret facility while another has them rendezvous and sneak into a German headquarters in disguise to rescue an operative. Many missions are performed solo but also sometimes include an AI companion for backup. Health is determined by a health bar that can be replenished using a selection of "medikits" found throughout levels with varying degrees of effect.

During missions, players can earn medals at the end of each level by meeting requirements such as completions of objectives, eliminating a number of enemies and maintaining a percentage of health throughout, all represented by a bronze, silver or gold star.

Plot
Frontline starts with Lieutenant James Steven "Jimmy" Patterson storming Omaha Beach as a part of Operation Overlord, after which the Office of Strategic Services (OSS) sends him to disrupt German U-boat operations. Patterson stows away aboard the fictional U-Boat U-4902 and infiltrates the German U-boat base in Lorient, France, destroying 4902 and two more U-boats and crippling the port; during his infiltration, he crosses paths with an SS Hauptsturmführer named Rudolf Ulbricht von Sturmgeist conducting an inspection, but Sturmgeist, unaware of Patterson's presence, leaves shortly before the base is destroyed.

Shortly after Patterson completes his mission in Lorient, the OSS discovers that the Germans are building a secret weapon, but their contact in the Dutch Resistance goes missing. Patterson is sent to drop with the 82nd Airborne during Operation Market Garden to find him, meeting up with the Resistance and learning the contact is being held in a Nazi-occupied manor. After infiltrating the manor, Patterson locates the contact and rescues him from German custody.

The OSS learns from the contact that the secret weapon is a highly advanced jet fighter called HO-IX, which has the potential to change the tide of airpower over Europe if it reaches production. Patterson is sent to sabotage the aircraft's production, however en route he is instructed to cross the Nijmegen Bridge, disarm the explosives wired to the bridge, and send supplies to the besieged British 1st Airborne Division trapped in Arnhem. The OSS makes contact with Patterson again, informing him that they have tracked down Sturmgeist, and learned he is the officer in charge of the HO-IX project. Patterson is sent to Emmerich to track Sturmgeist, pursuing him aboard the SS Officer's personal armored train, but Patterson is unable to catch him before he escapes.

Patterson abandons the train and proceeds to the secret aircraft facility outside Gotha on foot, destroying vital German supplies in a railroad depot before proceeding to the facility where the secret aircraft is being held. Once there, Patterson sabotages the facility and production lines, broadcasts the location of the facility to the Allies, and confronts Sturmgeist and his guards in the hangar of the HO-IX, killing him and using the HO-IX to escape the facility as it is destroyed by an Allied bombing raid.

Development

Soundtrack 

Medal of Honor: Frontline Original Soundtrack Recording is the soundtrack album for the game. The music was composed by Michael Giacchino in early 2001. The score was performed by the Northwest Sinfonia and recorded by Steve Smith at the Bastyr Chapel, between June 11 and June 15, 2001.

Different from the score releases of Medal of Honor and Medal of Honor: Underground, the CD album for Frontline was only available through EA Games' online store. A digital release was followed in 2005.

Parts of the soundtrack would also be re-used in several later games of the series, such as the Medal of Honor: Allied Assault Expansion Packs Spearhead and Breakthrough, Medal of Honor: Infiltrator, Medal of Honor: Pacific Assault, Medal of Honor: Vanguard and Medal of Honor: Airborne.

 Track listing 

Reception

By July 2006, the PlayStation 2 version of Medal of Honor: Frontline had sold 2.5 million copies and earned $95 million in the United States alone. Next Generation ranked it as the eighth-highest-selling game launched for the PlayStation 2, Xbox or GameCube between January 2000 and July 2006 in that country. The PlayStation 2 version also received a "Double Platinum" sales award from the Entertainment and Leisure Software Publishers Association (ELSPA), indicating sales of at least 600,000 copies in the United Kingdom; and a "Gold" certification from the Verband der Unterhaltungssoftware Deutschland (VUD), for sales of at least 100,000 units across Germany, Austria and Switzerland.

The game received "generally favorable" reviews according to video game review aggregator Metacritic. GameSpot named Frontline the best video game of May 2002. It won GameSpots annual "Best Sound on PlayStation 2" award and was a runner-up for "Best Music on PlayStation 2" and "Best Graphics (Technical) on PlayStation 2". It received further nominations in the "Best Shooter", "Best Music" and "Best Sound" categories among GameCube games, and "Best Music" and "Best Sound" among Xbox games.

High-definition remaster
At E3 2010, a high-definition version of Frontline was announced. The remastered version of Frontline was included in the PlayStation 3 version of Medal of Honor (2010) with updated gameplay options and also trophies support and remastered with high-definition graphics. The player  has the option to play with the classic gameplay, such as dual stick turning/strafing controls and dual button weapon switching, or modern based gameplay with iron sights, single stick looking and strafing, and button press crouching controls. In August 2011, Frontline'' was released for PlayStation Network.

Notes

References

External links
Official site

2002 video games
Electronic Arts games
GameCube games
Interactive Achievement Award winners
Frontline
Multiplayer online games
PlayStation 2 games
PlayStation Network games
World War II video games
Video games scored by Michael Giacchino
Video games set in France
Video games set in Germany
Video games set in the Netherlands
Xbox games
Video games developed in the United States